The following is a list of the 17 cantons of the Mayenne department, in France, following the French canton reorganisation which came into effect in March 2015:

 Bonchamp-lès-Laval
 Château-Gontier-sur-Mayenne-1
 Château-Gontier-sur-Mayenne-2
 Cossé-le-Vivien
 Ernée
 Évron
 Gorron
 L'Huisserie
 Lassay-les-Châteaux
 Laval-1
 Laval-2
 Laval-3
 Loiron-Ruillé
 Mayenne
 Meslay-du-Maine
 Saint-Berthevin
 Villaines-la-Juhel

References